No. 93 Group RAF is a former Royal Air Force group.

The group was formed on 15 June 1942 at Lichfield under RAF Bomber Command as No. 93 (Operational Training) Group. It moved to Eggington Hall, Egginton, Derby on 7 July 1942 and renamed to No. 93 (Bomber OTU) Group afterwards. It was disbanded on 14 February 1945.

Structure
 February 1943 at Egginton Hall, Derby
 No. 18 Operational Training Unit RAF at RAF Bramcote with the Vickers Wellington I, III
 No. 18 Operational Training Unit RAF at RAF Bitteswell with the Vickers Wellington I, III
 No. 27 Operational Training Unit RAF at RAF Lichfield with the Vickers Wellington I, III
 No. 27 Operational Training Unit RAF at RAF Church Broughton with the Vickers Wellington I, III
 No. 28 Operational Training Unit RAF at RAF Wymeswold with the Vickers Wellington I, III
 No. 28 Operational Training Unit RAF at RAF Castle Donington with the Vickers Wellington I, III
 No. 30 Operational Training Unit RAF at RAF Hixon with the Vickers Wellington III, X
 No. 30 Operational Training Unit RAF at RAF Seighford with the Vickers Wellington III, X

 February 1944 at Eggington Hall, Derby
 No. 18 Operational Training Unit RAF at RAF Finningley with the Vickers Wellington III, X
 No. 18 Operational Training Unit RAF at RAF Doncaster with the Vickers Wellington III, X
 No. 27 Operational Training Unit RAF at RAF Lichfield with the Vickers Wellington III, X
 No. 27 Operational Training Unit RAF at RAF Church Broughton with the Vickers Wellington III, X
 No. 30 Operational Training Unit RAF at RAF Hixon with the Vickers Wellington III, X
 No. 30 Operational Training Unit RAF at RAF Seighford with the Vickers Wellington III, X
 No. 82 Operational Training Unit RAF at RAF Ossington with the Vickers Wellington III, X
 No. 82 Operational Training Unit RAF at RAF Gamston with the Vickers Wellington III, X
 No. 83 Operational Training Unit RAF at RAF Peplow with the Vickers Wellington III, X

References

Citations

Bibliography

093